Chrysothamnus vaseyi, called Vasey's rabbitbrush, is a North American species of flowering plants in the tribe Astereae within the family Asteraceae. It has been found in Utah, Colorado, northern New Mexico, southern Wyoming, northern Arizona (Navajo County) and eastern Nevada (White Pine County).

Chrysothamnus vaseyi is a branching shrub up to 30 cm (12 inches) tall with tan or gray bark, becoming flaky as it gets old. It has many small, yellow flower heads clumped into dense arrays. The species grows in open woodlands alongside pine and oak.

References

External links
photo of herbarium specimen at Missouri Botanical Garden, collected in New Mexico, type specimen of Chrysothamnus vaseyi

Astereae
Flora of the Northwestern United States
Flora of the Southwestern United States
Flora of New Mexico
Plants described in 1895
Taxa named by Asa Gray
Taxa named by Edward Lee Greene
Flora without expected TNC conservation status